Carlos de Sousa Queirós is a former Angolan footballer and coach.

During 1988, he was in charge of the Angola.

He led the Angolan team in the 1990 FIFA World Cup qualification – CAF First Round, an international friendly and the 1988 CECAFA Cup.

References 

1946 births
Angolan football managers
Atlético Petróleos de Luanda managers
Living people